Mitko Lukovski (Macedonia) is a Macedonian basketball coach.

References

Living people
Macedonian basketball coaches
Year of birth missing (living people)